Clyde Donovan (formerly known as Clyde Goodman and Clyde Harris) is a fictional character in the adult animated television series South Park. He is voiced by series co-creator Trey Parker. Clyde is a student at South Park Elementary School, and is a member of Craig's Gang. He debuted as an unnamed background character in the series premiere "Cartman Gets an Anal Probe" on August 13, 1997, and first spoke in the next episode "Weight Gain 4000".

Biography
Clyde attends South Park Elementary School as a third, eventually fourth-grade student of Mr. Garrison's class. The latter took the position of the 45th President of the United States and was replaced by Ms. Nelson in season 19. Clyde resides in South Park, Colorado, and lives with his father, Roger, and an unnamed sister. His mother, Betsy, died in the events "Reverse Cowgirl" after Clyde left the toilet seat up. Though his name was 'Clyde Goodman' in the merchandise of the first few seasons, it was never used on the show. In "Quest for Ratings", he was named 'Clyde Donovan' during a news segment, but in "Lice Capades", he was referred to 'Clyde Harris' by the nurse. Eventually, his name later reverted back to 'Clyde Donovan' on his Facebook page in "You Have 0 Friends". He is a member of Craig's Gang, and consists of him, Craig Tucker, Tolkien Black, and Jimmy Valmer.

In South Park: Post Covid is shown to be assisting for Kenny McCormick's death. But, he is also an anti-vaxxer, as "out of shellfishness", refuses to get vaccinated.

Character

Creation and design
In the series premiere, "Cartman Gets an Anal Probe", Clyde is composed with construction paper and is animated through stop motion. In subsequent episodes, beginning with "Weight Gain 4000", he is animated via computer software, though his appearance is rendered to mimic the style of construction paper used in the first episode. Clyde is composed of primary colors and simple geometrical shapes but isn't offered free range associated with hand-drawn characters; he is usually shown one angle and animated in an intentionally jerky fashion.

Clyde has medium brown hair and wears a burgundy coat with blue trim and dark-gray pants. He occasionally wears blue mittens. He is also shown wearing a green t-shirt with a cow's face on it. On some occasions, Clyde can wear a red and white sports jacket resembling his coat. Trey Parker speaks in his normal vocal range, and is edited with ProTools as the pitch is altered to make the sound like that of a fourth grader.

Personality and traits
Clyde is shown to have low intelligence in some subjects, notably, math, such as in South Park: Bigger, Longer & Uncut, where, in solving five times two, he answers twelve, and Mr. Garrison refers to him as "a complete retard". On most things upsetting, he would sob uncontrollably, like in the episodes "Fourth Grade", "Fatbeard", and "It's Christmas in Canada". He also shows little to no interest when occasionally the show gets surreal. 

In some episodes, such as "The List" and "Sarcastaball", Clyde is shown to be a jock who is interested in sports, and has a high opinion of himself.

Reception
Clyde was ranked at #22 by Looper on a list entitled "25 Popular South Park Characters Ranked Worst to Best".

In other media
Clyde appears in numerous South Park-related media, such as appearing in the 1999 musical comedy adaption South Park: Bigger, Longer & Uncut, and video games like South Park: The Stick of Truth and South Park: The Fractured but Whole.

References

American male characters in television
Animated human characters
Child characters in animated television series
Comedy film characters
South Park characters
Television characters introduced in 1997
Animated characters introduced in 1997
Fictional characters from Colorado
Fictional elementary school students